Nevacolima is a genus of snout moths. It was described by Herbert H. Neunzig in 1994.

Species
 Nevacolima jaliscoensis
 Nevacolima zodia

References

Phycitini
Pyralidae genera